The following list includes settlements, geographic features, and political subdivisions of Minnesota whose names are derived from Native American languages.

Listings

State
 Minnesota – from the Dakota phrase mni-sota, meaning "turbid water".

Counties

 Anoka County
 Shared with the city of Anoka.
 Chippewa County
 Chisago County – shortened from the Ojibwe language: Gichi-zaaga'igan "Big lake"
 Dakota County
 Isanti County
 Shared with the city of Isanti
 Kanabeck County – from the Ojibwe language: Ginebiko-ziibiing "At the Snake River"
 Kandiyohi County
 Shared with the city of Kandiyohi
 Koochiching County – from the Ojibwe language: Gojijiing "At the inlet"
 Mahnomen County – from the Ojibwe language: Manoomin "Wild rice"
 Shared with the city of Mahnomen
 Wabasha County
 Wadena County
 Shared with the city of Wadena.
 Waseca County
 Shared with the city of Waseca.
 Watonwan County
 Winona County
 Shared with the city of Winona.

Settlements

 Ah-gwah-ching – from the Ojibwe language: Agwajiing "Outdoors"
 Bejou – from the Ojibwe language: Bizhiw "bobcat, lynx"
 Bemidji – Shortened from the Ojibwe language: Bemijigamaag "Traversing lake"
 Lake Bemidji
 Bena – From the Ojibwe language: Bine "grouse, partridge"
 Chanhassen
 Chaska
 Chengwatana – from the Ojibwe language: Zhingwaadena "Pine-town"
 Chokio
 Cohasset
 Cokato
 Endion – from the Ojibwe language: Endaayaan "my home"
 Eyota
 Hackensack
 Hanska
 Hokah
 Kabetogama – from the Ojibwe language: Gaa-biitoogamaag "Place of paralleling water-body"
 Kanaranzi
 Kasota
 Keewatin – from the Ojibwe language: Giiwedin "North"
 Keewaydin, Minneapolis – from the Ojibwe language: Giiwedin "North"
 Mahtomedi
 Mahtowa
 Mankato
 Menahga
 Mendota
 Mendota Heights
 Minnehaha
 Minnehaha Creek
 Minnehaha Falls
 Minneiska
 Minneola
 Minnetonka
 Muskoda
 Nashwauk
 Nokomis – from the Ojibwe language: Nookomis "my grandmother".
 Nokomis East – from the Ojibwe language: Nookomis "my grandmother".
 Nisswa
 Township and City of Ogema – from the Ojibwe language: Ogimaa "Chief, leader"
 Okabena
 Onamia
 Otsego
 Ottawa
 Owanka
 Owatonna
 Pequot Lakes
 Pokegama – from the Ojibwe language: Bakegamaa "Side lake"
 Puposky
 Saco
 Saginaw
 Sebeka
 Shakopee – from the Dakota language: Shák'pí "Six"
 Squaw Lake
 Wabasso
 Waconia
 Wahkon
 Wakemup
 Wannaska
 Wasioja
 Waubun – from the Ojibwe language: Waaban "Dawn/East"
 Waukenabo
 Wawina
 Wayzata
 Wenonah
 Winona, Minnesota
 Yucatan

Bodies of water

 Bde Maka Ska
 Lake Esquagama
 Esquagamah Lake
 Inguadona Lake
 Lake Kabetogama
 Kawishiwi River
 Kitchi Lake
 Minnesota River
 Mississippi River
 Nemadji River
 Lake Ogechie
 Ogishke Muncie Lake
 Pokegama Lake
 Lake Saganaga
 Sauk River (Minnesota)
 Lake Shakopee
 Lake Sisabagama
 Siseebakwet Lake
 Us-kab-wan-ka River
 Watab River
 Lake Winnibigoshish

Landforms

 Cayuga Range
 Mesabi Range

See also
List of place names in the United States of Native American origin

References

Citations

Sources

 Bright, William (2004). Native American Placenames of the United States. Norman: University of Oklahoma Press. .
 Campbell, Lyle (1997). American Indian Languages: The Historical Linguistics of Native America. Oxford: Oxford University Press. 

 
 
Place names